Snezhny (masculine), Snezhnaya (feminine), or Snezhnoye (neuter) is the name of several rural localities in Russia:
Snezhny, Chelyabinsk Oblast, a settlement in Snezhnensky Selsoviet of Kartalinsky District of Chelyabinsk Oblast
Snezhny, Khabarovsk Krai, a settlement in Komsomolsky District of Khabarovsk Krai
Snezhny, Rostov Oblast, a khutor in Komissarovskoye Rural Settlement of Dubovsky District of Rostov Oblast
Snezhny, Saratov Oblast, a settlement in Petrovsky District of Saratov Oblast
Snezhnoye, Chukotka Autonomous Okrug, a selo in Anadyrsky District of Chukotka Autonomous Okrug
Snezhnoye, Perm Krai, a selo in Oktyabrsky District of Perm Krai
Snezhnaya, a village in Svetlopolyansky Selsoviet of Ketovsky District of Kurgan Oblast

See also
Snezhnye Barsy, junior ice hockey club